Szyba  is a village in the administrative district of Gmina Nowe Miasteczko, within Nowa Sól County, Lubusz Voivodeship, in western Poland.

The village has a population of 49.

References

Szyba